Steliana Nistor (born 15 September 1989) is a Romanian former artistic gymnast. She was a key member of the Romanian team between 2006 and 2008, where she helped the Romania win team bronze medals at the 2007 World Championships and the 2008 Olympics. Individually, she is the 2007 world all-around and beam silver medallist, the 2007 and 2008 European silver medallist on the uneven bars and the 2007 bronze medallist on the balance beam. Nistor was a strong all-around competitor but her best events were balance beam and uneven bars.

Early gymnastic career

Steliana began gymnastics at the age of five, at the gymnastics club CSS Sibiu under the training of the former Olympic champion Mihaela Stănuleţ and of the coach Raluca Bugner (since 1998). In 1998 she placed first with the team at an international competition in France. In 2001, she won the all-around title, gold on bars and beam and bronze on floor at the Romanian junior championships in her age category.
These successes allowed her to join the national junior gymnastic team in 2002. As a national junior she medaled in several international and national competitions.  The 2004 European Junior Championships Amsterdam was an especially successful meet for Steliana.  She won gold in the all around and floor final events and silver in the team and vault finals. Her all around score was the highest score of all the gymnasts, including the senior ones.

Senior career

2005 - 2006

Since 2005, Steliana has been a member of the senior national gymnastic team. Unfortunately she was sidelined for nearly six months with back and knee injuries and she did not compete at all in 2005. It was only after an intensive rehabilitation process that she was able to return, and Nistor sometimes wore  a protective brace on her right knee. She returned to the international competitions in 2006 at the Cottbus cup where she finished sixth in the beam finals. At the European Championships, Volos Greece she medaled silver with the team and she finished sixth on the uneven bars finals. At that competition  she only competed on uneven bars. However, during 2006 she reestablished herself as contender in  all around competitions winning the all around silver behind Sandra Izbaşa at the Romanian Nationals.
Steliana was also a member of the national team competing for the 2006 World Championships in Aarhus, Denmark. According to the team's coach Nicolae Forminte, the 2006  team was Romania's most inexperienced generation since the time of Nadia Comăneci. From all  the team members only Floarea Leonida  had the experience of a world championship.  In Aarhus, the Romanian team placed fourth in the team competition, the first time since 1981 that the Romanian team failed to medal at a world championship.  She also placed fourth all-around behind her teammate Sandra Izbaşa and seventh on beam and on uneven bars.
She ended 2006 by pairing with Marian Drăgulescu for the silver medal at the Swiss Cup and by winning gold on beam and bronze on floor at the Glasgow Grand Prix.

2007

In 2007, she had several successful international meets. In the qualification round of the 2007 European Championships, Amsterdam, The Netherlands she placed second all around, third on beam and floor and fourth on bars. She won silver on bars and bronze on beam. The last Romanian gymnast to medal on bars at  European Championships was Claudia Presecan in 1998. Her team colleague  Sandra Izbaşa won the all around silver medal.

At the 2007 World Championships, she helped her team to qualify in the third place by scoring the highest all around mark of the women's qualifications. Individually, she qualified first in the all around final and fourth on beam and fifth on uneven bars.   She won silver in the all around event behind Shawn Johnson and silver on  beam behind Nastia Liukin and placed sixth on the uneven bars finals. She also contributed considerably to the team bronze medal by receiving the highest average score of all her team colleagues.

Besides the European and  World championships she competed at various world cup events. She won the Swiss Cup mixed pair event with Flavius Koczi, medaled gold on bars and bronze on floor at the Glasgow Gand Prix and won gold on beam and floor and bronze on bars at the Ghent World Cup

2008 and the Olympics

In 2008, she competed at the European Championships in Clermond-Ferrand, France. She qualified second and fifth on beam and uneven bars finals, respectively  and placed ten on floor and vault. She won  gold with the team,  silver on the uneven bars and after a fall she placed 6th on beam finals. Had there been a senior all around competition, Steliana would have won the title with her 60.700, highlighted by a 15.400 on bars (toe-on-1 and 1/2 to Jaeger; toe-on-Tkatchev-Pak) and 15.800 on beam (flip-flop full). A picture of her performing on the floor exercise at these European Championships appeared on the cover of May 2008 International Gymnastics Magazine.

The 2008 Romanian Nationals coincided with Nistor's exams, so she juggled a full competition with her studies.  Nistor won the all-around and two events and scored 10s on Romanian language and literature, English and Sports. Her final average was 8.95, placing her among the top ten students in Deva. The process, Nistor told Prosport, was "draining," and she only competed bars at a dual meet with Italy the following week to give her mind and body a rest.

Together with Sandra Izbaşa, Anamaria Tămârjan, Gabriela Drăgoi, Andreea Grigore, and Andreea Acatrinei, Steliana was a member of the Romanian team at the 2008 Summer Olympic Games Beijing, China. In the team competition she did all four events and contributed heavily to the team score on uneven bars with a world class  routine (scored 16.150). She won the bronze medal with the team and placed 5th in the all-around and 7th on uneven bars. Following the Olympic games, Nistor went back home while the other gymnasts went to Constanta for a holiday/training camp by the seaside. A few weeks later, she formally announced on television that she would be retiring, having been bothered by back pains for quite some time.

Retirement
After retirement from gymnastics she studied physical education, sports, and coaching in her hometown of Sibiu and was a representative of sportswear products.  After graduation she went to Norway to work as a gymnastics coach, first at Drammen Turn club and then at Hammer Turn club in Fjellhamar.

Skills
Nistor skills included  a handspring to back full on balance beam, as well as a front flip to Arabesque. On bars, she performed a toe-on reverse hecht (called a Ray) to a Pak salto.

Floor Music
2006  Ritual fire dance from "El amor brujo" by Manuel de Falla

References

External links
 
 
 
 “Steliana Nistor: unofficial website”
 Site of fans in Brazil
 Steliana Nistor: Unofficial Fan Site (Romanian)
 Steliana Nistor photogallery

1989 births
Living people
Sportspeople from Sibiu
Romanian female artistic gymnasts
European champions in gymnastics
Medalists at the World Artistic Gymnastics Championships
Gymnasts at the 2008 Summer Olympics
Olympic gymnasts of Romania
Olympic bronze medalists for Romania
Olympic medalists in gymnastics
Medalists at the 2008 Summer Olympics
21st-century Romanian women